Jon Gundersen (born 1945) is an American diplomat. Gundersen served as the Chargé d'Affaires ad interim United States to Ukraine, Estonia, Iceland and Norway.

Biography

He served as an officer in the United States Army in Vietnam. He was a member of the first US counter-terrorism "Sky Marshall" operations in the early 1970s and has worked as a Merchant Sailor. Gundersen served in numerous assignments both in US and overseas, concentrating on the Nordic Region, arms control and political-military issues. He served as Chargé d'Affaires and Deputy Chief of Mission in a number of nations, including Ukraine (1992), Estonia (1994-1995), Iceland and Norway. He opened the first U. S. mission in Kyiv in 1992 and has been assigned to Russia, the United Nations, and as Political Advisor to the Special Operations Command and Senior Advisor for Iraqi Reconstruction. He is the Chair of Advanced Nordic Area Studies at the Foreign Service Institute. He also teaches at the Joint Special Operations University and works for the State Department declassifying sensitive documents. In the 2020 presidential election, Gundersen supported the Republican Voters Against Trump campaign for Democratic candidate Joe Biden.

References

External links
 Embassy of the United States in Kyiv
 American Diplomacy. Jon Gundersen
 Department History. Jon Gundersen

Living people
1945 births
Ambassadors of the United States to Ukraine
Ambassadors of the United States to Estonia
20th-century American diplomats